James Arthur Ewing (born October 1, 1916) was the governor of American Samoa. He took the office on November 28, 1952 and resigned just over four months later, on March 4, 1953. He was appointed by President Harry S. Truman.

Biography 
He was born in Boardman, Ohio and later lived in Youngstown. Prior to his appointment, Ewing was an executive with an Ohio steel company.

In July 1956, his wife, former model Bernice Ewing, sued him for divorce on grounds of extreme cruelty. A year later, a judge increased the payments but it was stated Ewing's whereabouts were unknown; he had last been heard from in Fiji in January of that year, when payments abruptly stopped. At the time of his father's death in 1961, Ewing was residing in Capri, Italy.

References

Governors of American Samoa
American steel industry businesspeople
Businesspeople from Youngstown, Ohio
Politicians from Youngstown, Ohio
Military personnel from Ohio
American Samoa Democrats
Ohio Democrats
1916 births
Possibly living people